Anthony King may refer to:

Anthony King (basketball) (born 1985), US-born Cypriot basketball player
Anthony King (English cricketer) (born 1932), English cricketer
Anthony King (Barbadian cricketer) (born 1943), Barbadian cricketer
Anthony King (political scientist) (1934–2017), Canadian-born professor of government
Anthony King (writer) (born 1975), American writer, director, and comedian

See also
Antony King (born 1974), British live audio engineer
Tony King (disambiguation)
 King (surname)